The Oxford University Democratic Socialist Club (OUDSC) was a splinter group from Oxford University Labour Club (OULC), formed in 1940 after disaffiliation by the national Labour Party of OULC over its opposition to the Second World War and its support for the Soviet Union. Its first chair was Tony Crosland, and its first treasurer Roy Jenkins. David Ginsburg was also a chair. OUDSC merged with OULC again in 1943.

References 

Student organizations established in 1940
1943 disestablishments in the United Kingdom
Democratic Socialist Club
Politics of Oxford
Democratic Socialist Club
Labour Party (UK) breakaway groups
Defunct political organisations based in the United Kingdom
1940 establishments in England